Bašelj is a settlement in the Municipality of Preddvor in the Upper Carniola region of Slovenia.

Name
Bašelj was attested in historical sources as Uasche in 1156, Vaschel in 1395, Baysch in 1484, and Baschel in 1488, among other spellings.

Church

The local church, built on a hill above the settlement, is dedicated to Saint Lawrence and contains 15th-century frescos.

References

External links
Bašelj on Geopedia

Populated places in the Municipality of Preddvor